Gao Xin (born 12 May 1994, in Tianjin) is a Chinese male tennis player. Gao was a wild card and lost in the first round of the 2014 ATP Shenzhen Open.

Gao reached a career-high singles ranking of world No.434 on November 7, 2016, and a career-high doubles ranking of world No. 203 on April 2, 2018. He has reached 1 singles final on the ITF tour where he was defeated. He has reached 40 doubles finals posting a record of 21 wins and 19 losses, including a 3–2 record in ATP Challenger Tour finals.

In 2018, Gao played in his first ATP doubles match, when he received a wild card entry into the main doubles draw of the 2018 Chengdu Open along with partner Te Rigele. They were defeated in the first round by Matthew Ebden and Mischa Zverev 2–6, 2–6. The following year at the 2019 Chengdu Open he again received a wild card entry but would capitalize on the opportunity this time, as he won his first ATP Tour match when he and partner Zhe Li defeated Denis Shapovalov and Jordan Thompson in the first round 7–5, 2–6, [10–1]. They were defeated in the quarterfinals (which was the second round) by Nikola Cacic and Dušan Lajović 6–7(5-7), 2–6.

ATP Challenger and ITF Futures finals

Singles: 1 (0–1)

Doubles: 40 (21–19)

References

External links

1994 births
Living people
Chinese male tennis players
Tennis players from Tianjin
Universiade medalists in table tennis
Universiade bronze medalists for China
Medalists at the 2007 Summer Universiade